Leonard Salzedo (24 September 1921 – 6 May 2000) was an English composer and conductor of Spanish descent.

Salzedo was born in London.  After some early lessons from William Lloyd Webber he went on to study composition under Herbert Howells and violin under Isolde Menges at the Royal College of Music in London. Other teachers included Gordon Jacob (orchestration) and George Dyson (conducting). His first acknowledged score was the String Quartet No 1 of 1942, op 1. On leaving the college in 1944 Salzedo immediately became a freelance composer, supplementing his earnings by playing violin with the London Philharmonic Orchestra and the Royal Philharmonic. He worked closely with the Ballet Rambert, for whom his first ballet, The Fugitive, was commissioned in 1944, receiving over 400 performances over the following six years. In 1945 Salzedo married the dancer Pat Clover, and the two of them were both closely involved with Les Ballets Nègres, a mostly black dance group founded in 1946 by Berto Pasuka and Richie Riley. He wrote four scores for the group for piano, tom tom and maracas: De Prophet, They Came, Market Day and Aggrey.

His most successful ballet was The Witch Boy based on the ‘Ballad of Barbara Allan’, choreographed by Jack Carter and premiered by the Ballet der Lage Landen in Amsterdam in May 1956. It received over 1,000 performance in 30 different countries, and also became popular as a concert suite. Four of his ballet scores were choreographed by Norman Morrice: The Travellers (1963), The Realms of Choice (1965), Hazard (1967) and The Empty Suit (1970). Salzedo was musical director of the Ballet Rambert from 1967 to 1972 and principal conductor with the Scottish Ballet from 1972-74. He became musical director of the City Ballet of London in 1982 and devoted himself full-time to composition from 1986.

He wrote many film scores, including several for Hammer Films, amongst them the war movie The Steel Bayonet (1957) and the horror film The Revenge of Frankenstein (1958). But chamber music was also central to his output, including 10 string quartets spanning his whole career - from No 1 in 1942 to No 10 (op 140) dating from 1997. Percussion forms another strand of his work, including a Percussion Concerto (1968) and several works for percussion ensemble. After 1986 he had more time to work on larger scale pieces such as the Requiem Sine Voxibus ("Requiem Without Voices") for large orchestra (1989), the Stabat Mater (1991), the Violin Concerto (1992) and the Piano Concerto (1994), which was written for Leslie Howard. There are also two symphonies from earlier in his career: No 1 (1952) and No 2 (1954).

The fanfare which forms the first six bars of Salzedo's Divertimento for three trumpets and three trombones, opus 49 (1959), was used as the theme tune for the Open University's educational programmes on BBC television and radio from the 1970s to the 1990s. Another of his tunes, Guadalajara, was used by the BBC to accompany their "pie chart" schools' presentation during the 1960s and early 1970s, up until 1973.

Salzedo orchestrated Thomas Beecham's notorious and still-controversial 1959 recording of Handel's Messiah for modern full orchestra, usually credited to Sir Eugene Goossens. According to Beecham's widow Shirley, he became impatient with Goossens's slow writing pace and was not happy with the quality of his work.

Salzedo died in Leighton Buzzard, Bedfordshire, aged 78. A centenary celebration concert was held at Conway Hall in London on 24 September, 2022.

General sources
Larson, Randall D. Music from the House of Hammer: Music in the Hammer Horror Films, 1950–1980. Lanham: Scarecrow Press, 1996.

Citations

External links
 The Leonard Salzedo Society
 Leonard Salzedo biography by his daughter, Caroline Salzedo
 Leonard Salzedo A Life Composed in Music, centenary year video (2021)
 Leonard Salzedo (1921-2000) by Paul Conway
  Biography from the Amoris International publishing house
 
 Details of BBC Schools' presentation at sub-tv
 

1921 births
2000 deaths
20th-century British male musicians
20th-century classical composers
20th-century classical violinists
20th-century British conductors (music)
20th-century English composers
Alumni of the Royal College of Music
British male conductors (music)
British male violinists
English classical violinists
English conductors (music)
English film score composers
English male film score composers
English people of Spanish descent
Jewish classical composers
People associated with the Open University
Male classical violinists